Agricola is an unincorporated community in Glascock County, in the U.S. state of Georgia.

History
A post office called Agricola was established in 1887, and remained in operation until 1950. In 1900, Agricola had 31 inhabitants.

References

Unincorporated communities in Glascock County, Georgia
Unincorporated communities in Georgia (U.S. state)